Tania Alvarado is a Spanish actress. She appeared in the comedy film Death of a Bureaucrat (1966), directed by Tomás Gutiérrez Alea and scored by Leo Brouwer. She appeared in two western films directed by John Wood: Too Much Gold for One Gringo (1972), and Abre tu fosa, amigo... llega Sábata (1971), starring Richard Harrison.

Filmography
 They Believed He Was No Saint (1972) as María
 Dig Your Grave Friend... Sabata's Coming (1971) as Helen
 El corsario (1970)
 Django Defies Sartana (1970) as Maria
 Death of a Bureaucrat (1966)

References

External links
 

20th-century Spanish actresses
Spanish film actresses
Living people
Year of birth missing (living people)